Choti Bala is a town and  union council of Dera Ghazi Khan District in the Punjab province of Pakistan. It is located at 29°49'0N 70°15'0E and has an altitude of 217 metres (715 feet).

HISTORY OF CHOTI BALA 

Choti Bala is 50 kilo meter away from Dera Ghazi Khan in South West. It's situated in Koh e Sulaiman mountains. The town was founded probably in 18th century. It was the centre and commercial hub of all native villages. Before partition Hindus were occupying all trades and after their migration locals took over the local trade. Bughlani, Qureshi, Bhatti, Bhutta, Waria Gazar and Mir are the major castes settled in Choti Bala.  

Choti Bala is rich in fertile land, water is available in abundance here, water level is 20 to 60 feet. Local people here are Bughlani, Qureshi Bhutta Bhatti and Waria. The native language of the people here is Saraiki.

When it rains on Mount Sulaiman, there are two streams here that give the view of a river. There is a passage of two streams, one is called Mithavan and the other is Khonkhar, which irrigates the entire area. Its water falls in DG Kanal. Due to lack of bridge, difficulties of the people here increase during rainy days. It is very difficult to cross these streams. Patients and business people get trapped. Lack of education. Due to which most of the population is illiterate.

References

Populated places in Dera Ghazi Khan District
Union councils of Dera Ghazi Khan District
Cities and towns in Punjab, Pakistan